Eustace Lorenz Pereira (born 4 July 1939) is a Sri Lankan former first-class cricketer.

The son of E. O. E. Pereira, he was born at Colombo in July 1939. Pereira was educated at Royal College in Colombo, where he played for the college cricket team. From there he travelled to England to study at Fitzwilliam College, Cambridge. While studying at Cambridge, he played first-class cricket for Cambridge University Cricket Club in 1962 and 1963, making one appearance against the Free Foresters in 1962 and Nottinghamshire in 1962. He scored 11 runs in these matches, with a highest score of 8 not out.

After graduating from Cambridge he returned to Sri Lanka, before emigrating to Australia where he worked for and Town and Country Planning Board in Victoria, eventually becoming a senior city planner in Melbourne. Amongst his achievements was the introduction of the retractable roof on the Rod Laver Arena.

References

External links

1939 births
Living people
Cricketers from Colombo
Alumni of Royal College, Colombo
Alumni of Fitzwilliam College, Cambridge
Sri Lankan cricketers
Cambridge University cricketers
Sri Lankan emigrants to Australia
Sri Lankan urban planners